Windsor Nature Park is a nature park in Singapore.  It was opened on 22 April 2017.  The park forms a green buffer zone between Central Catchment Nature Reserve and the urbanized areas of Singapore.  The park contains three hiking trails and a canopy walkway.

Several species of birds live in Windsor Nature Park, including the greater racket-tailed drongo.  Mammals living in the park include the endangered Sunda pangolin.  A group of bachelor Raffles' banded langur monkeys also lives in the park.

References

2017 establishments in Singapore
Parks in Singapore
Nature parks